John Philip Horrocks-Taylor (27 October 1934 – 11 February 2021) was a rugby union fly half who played for Leicester Tigers between 1958 and 1963; he represented England 9 times between 1958 and 1964 and was selected for the 1959 British Lions tour to Australia and New Zealand where he played in the third test.  He was a Cambridge University blue in Rugby for 1956 and 1957.

Career
Horrocks-Taylor came up to St John's College, Cambridge in 1955 after playing in his native Yorkshire for Halifax and completing his national service at Catterick.

Horrocks-Taylor joined Leicester in 1958, making his debut on 27 September against Harlequins at Twickenham, Horrocks-Taylor was described as a "brilliant half-back, who is the most talked young player about in rugger circles".

He also played for Wasps and Halifax.

References

1934 births
2021 deaths
English rugby union players
England international rugby union players
Leicester Tigers players
Rugby union fly-halves
Cambridge University R.U.F.C. players
British & Irish Lions rugby union players from England
Yorkshire County RFU players
Place of death missing
Rugby union players from Halifax, West Yorkshire
Middlesbrough RFC players